Clemente Morando (17 August 1899 – 30 August 1972) was an Italian association football manager and footballer who played as a goalkeeper. He represented the Italy national football team three times, the first being on 6 November 1921, the occasion of a friendly match against Switzerland in a 1–1 away draw.

References

1899 births
1972 deaths
Italian footballers
Italy international footballers
Association football goalkeepers
Valenzana Mado players
U.S. Alessandria Calcio 1912 players